The Redl-Zipf V-2 rocket facility (code name Schlier) located in central Austria between Vöcklabruck and Vöcklamarkt and established in September 1943 began operation for V-2 rocket motor testing after Raxwerke test equipment had been moved from Friedrichshafen.

The facility tested V-2 combustion chambers' compatibility with turbopumps since the rocket did not have a controller for reducing the turbopumping of propellant into the chamber if pressure became too high. The World War II facility used as a starting base the cellars and storage tunnels of an old brewery. Construction of the facility was under the command of SS-Obergruppenführer Hans Kammler who was responsible for Nazi civil engineering projects and its top secret weapons programs and used forced labor from the Schlier-Redl-Zipf subcamp of the Mauthausen-Gusen concentration camp. The construction added a large number of tunnels and supporting structures and included a liquid oxygen generation plant in one of the tunnels.

A large explosion on February 29, 1944 killed 14 people, destroyed several installations, and halted production of liquid oxygen at the facility for almost two months. A report to Albert Speer indicated the cause of the explosion was a liquid oxygen leak and an open carbide lamp carried by the plant foreman. Another serious explosion at 12:29 PM on August 28, 1944 killed 27 people and caused significant damage to the facility. Among the 27 casualties was Ilse Oberth (1924-1944), the youngest daughter of rocket pioneer Hermann Julius Oberth. Ilse Oberth worked at the facility as a rocket technician and had arrived four months earlier on April 28, 1944. All of those killed in the explosion were given a state funeral and are interred at the Vöcklabruck-Schöndorf cemetery. After the August 1944 explosion, liquid oxygen production at the Schlier plant stopped once again which led to the establishment of a third V-2 liquid oxygen plant (5000 tons/month) at a slate quarry at Lehesten near the Mittelwerk (turbopump/chamber compatibility testing for Mittelwerk production was also performed at the Lehesten facility).

Karl Heimberg, who had worked at Peenemünde Test Stand 7, was transferred to "Vorwerk Süd" at Redl-Zipf and then, for the period from late 1944-early April 1945, to Lehesten (he later returned to Peenemünde with Walter Riedel III to burn design office files and participated in the post-war Operation Backfire).

The Operation Bernhard forced labor team at Sachsenhausen concentration camp for producing counterfeit British money was transferred to the Schlier-Redl-Zipf subcamp until the beginning of May 1945, when the team of prisoners was ordered to transfer to the Ebensee concentration camp.

References

German V-2 rocket facilities
V-weapon subterranea
History of Upper Austria
Austria in World War II